Emily Julian McManus (December 30, 1865 – September 21, 1918) was a Canadian poet, author, and educator. In addition to a number of poems, some of which were reproduced in the collection of George William Ross, and some by William Douw Lighthall in Songs of the Great Dominion, she was the author of "Froney" (a prize story in the Toronto Week), of "A Romance of Carleton", of "The Thirteenth Temptation", and of the Old, Old Story, the latter a novel.

Biography
Emily Julian McManus was born in Bath, Ontario, December 30, 1865. She was of Irish descent on both her father's and mother's side. Her parents were Patrick Teevan McManus (1814-1888) and Julia Ann (Koen) McManus (1826-1864). 

McManus grew up an imaginative child, fond of the companionship of books, especially books of poetry. She obtained her early education in the public school of her native town. She also attended the Kingston Collegiate and Vocational Institute and the Ottawa Normal School, being fitted to be a public-school teacher in the latter. After teaching for a period with marked success, she entered, in 1888, the arts department of Queen's University at Kingston (M.A., with First Class final honours in English Literature and Political Science, 1894).

McManus was a literary reviewer for several years for the Free Press and the Ottawa Journal. She contributed short poems, sketches, and critical essays to various magazines, including the Kingston, Ontario Whig, the Toronto Globe, the Irish Canadian, the Educational Journal, Queen's College Journal, and the Toronto Week. She also contributed poems to Lighthall's Songs of the Great Dominion (Walter Scott, London, 1889); he made special mention of McManus' poem, "Manitoba," in his introduction to that work. Among the best known of her poetical pieces were "Gordon at Khartoum", "Manitoba", "Robert Browning", "Canada", "Drifting", "In April Weather", and "The Lady of Ponce de Leon".

McManus was a member of the Children's Flower Guild, Queen's Alumni of Ottawa, Women's Canadian Club, and the University Women's Club. She favored woman's suffrage.

Emily Julian McManus died September 21, 1918.

Selected works

Poems
 "Gordon at Khartoum"
 "Manitoba"
 "Robert Browning"
 "Canada"
 "Drifting"
 "In April Weather"
 "The Lady of Ponce de Leon"

Short stories
  "Froney"
 "A Romance of Carleton"
 "The Thirteenth Temptation"

Novels
 Old, Old Story

References

External links
 
 

1865 births
1918 deaths
Wikipedia articles incorporating text from A Woman of the Century
People from Lennox and Addington County
19th-century Canadian poets
19th-century Canadian women writers
Queen's University at Kingston alumni
19th-century Canadian educators
20th-century Canadian educators
Canadian literary critics
Canadian women literary critics